Jake Reed (born 13 May 1991) is an English footballer who plays for  side Lowestoft Town, where he plays as a forward.

Career
Reed progressed through Great Yarmouth Town's youth system before joining the first-team, where he scored 31 goals in 81 appearances. He signed for League Two club Dagenham & Redbridge on a two-year contract in July 2011, alongside Rob Edmans.

He made his professional debut for Dagenham & Redbridge on 9 August, coming on as a substitute in their 5–0 away loss to Bournemouth in the Football League Cup Second Round. He came off the bench to score his first goal for Dagenham on the first of April 2013 in a 4–2 home loss to Bristol Rovers.

On 1 October 2013, Reed had his contract terminated by mutual consent. He joined Lowestoft Town in the Isthmian League Premier Division, scoring 20 goals in 36 games in the remainder of the season, as the club earned promotion to the Conference North. However, at the end of the season he left the club to sign for Isthmian League Division One North club AFC Sudbury.

After just a few months at A.F.C Sudbury, Reed returned to Lowestoft Town to play in the Conference North for the remainder of their 2014–15 campaign.
Jake is also a world record holder, holding the record for longest break ever taken at a staggering 84 minutes and 42 second! recently held by charlie harrison-reeve.

Career statistics

References

External links
Dagenham & Redbridge profile

1996 births
Living people
English footballers
Association football forwards
Great Yarmouth Town F.C. players
Dagenham & Redbridge F.C. players
Lowestoft Town F.C. players
Leiston F.C. players
A.F.C. Sudbury players
English Football League players
Isthmian League players